Jahanabad (also Romanized as Jahānābād) is a village in Shohada Rural District, in the Central District of Meybod County, Yazd Province, Iran. At the 2006 census, its population was 90, in 27 families.

References 

Populated places in Meybod County